Songs of Silence - Live in Tokyo is a live album by Finnish power metal band Sonata Arctica. Both Japanese and Korean versions have an exclusive cover art and one bonus track, and their first edition had a bonus CD containing three tracks.

Track listing

Personnel
Tony Kakko – vocals
Jani Liimatainen – guitar
Marko Paasikoski – bass guitar
Mikko Härkin – keyboards
Tommy Portimo – drums

Charts

Info
Mixed by Mikko Karmila at Finnvox Studios
Mastered by Mika Jussila Finnvox Studios
Cover art by Janne "ToxicAngel" Pitkänen
Photos in cover taken by Timo Isoaho and Mape Ollila

Notes
At the end of "False News Travel Fast", Jani Liimatainen plays a riff that is closely similar to the main riff of the song "Speed of Light" by Stratovarius (a similar riff is also used in "Future Shock"). Jani Liimatainen also plays that riff before the first chorus of "Blank File" in the same concert.

Sonata Arctica albums
2002 live albums
Spinefarm Records live albums